Beach soccer at the 2012 Asian Beach Games was held from 16 June to 21 June 2012 in Haiyang, China.

The draw to divide the 15 teams was conducted on 6 June 2012. All kickoff times are of local time in Haiyang (UTC+08:00).

Medalists

Results

Preliminary round

Group A

Group B

Group C

Group D

Knockout round

Quarterfinals

Semifinals

Bronze medal match

Gold medal match

Goalscorers

11 goals

 

8 goals

 

7 goals

 
 
 

6 goals

 
 
 
 

5 goals

 
 

4 goals

 
 
 
 
 
 
 
 
 
 

3 goals

 
 
 
 
 
 
 
 
 

2 goals

 
 
 
 
 
 
 
 
 
 
 
 
 
 
 

1 goal

References

External links
 Official Website

2012 Asian Beach Games events
Beach
2012
2012
2012 in Chinese football
2012 in beach soccer